The petit lac Ha! Ha! is a freshwater lake in the Ferland-et Boilleau municipality, in the administrative region of Saguenay-Lac-Saint-Jean, in the province of Quebec, in Canada. Little Ha Lake! Ha! is located on the east side of Lake Ha! Ha! into which it drains.

The southern portion of the lake is served by route 381, which cuts the lake at the peninsula attached to the north shore, then heads northwest to the Northwestern part of lake Ha! Ha!. The scenic landscape of “Petit lac Ha! Ha!” with the surrounding mountains attracts nature lovers.

Forestry is the main economic activity of the sector, followed by recreational tourism. 

The surface of the “Petit lac Ha! Ha!” is usually frozen from late November to early April. The ice shelf is generally thick enough to allow safe passage from mid-December to late March.

Geography 

The main hydrographic slopes near “Petit lac Ha! Ha!” are:
 north side: Quiscale Creek, Huard Lake, Cedar River, Cedar Lake, Otis Lake;
 east side: Malbaie River, Cabin Creek;
 south side: Malbaie River, Michta Lake, Ha! Ha! River, Cruche River, Barley River;
 west side: rivière à Pierre, Ha! Ha! River, Lake Ha! Ha!, rivière à Mars.

The “petit lac Ha! Ha!. The “petit lac Ha! Ha!” is fed by the Quiscane stream (coming from the North and draining the Huard lake) and by an unidentified stream flowing from the east. This lake includes the Canots Cove (west side), Creuse Bay (South Shore) and Lambert Bay (South Shore).

The mouth of the lake is located at:
 southeast of the mouth of Lake Ha! Ha!]];
 south of the village center of Boileau, Quebec;
 south of Huard Lake;
 southeast of the confluence of the Ha! Ha! River and the Bay of Ha! Ha!;
 south-east of downtown Saguenay city;
 north-west of downtown Baie-Saint-Paul.
From the bridge separating the two lakes, the current flows through Lake Ha! Ha! on  northwesterly to the dam at its mouth, then the stream successively descends the Ha! Ha!

Toponymy 
The toponym "Petit lac Ha! Ha!" is linked to the lake, the river and the bay of the same name.
The specific term "Ha! Ha!" has several interpretations according to the sources consulted. A popular interpretation associates it with an exclamation indicating irony or onomatopoeia of laughter. 

However, the name probably comes from an alteration of a Montagnais toponym almost unpronounceable in French, which in Algonquin means a place where bark is exchanged. This is similar to the etymology of the Baie des Ha! Ha!, also part of the Saguenay River basin.

According to some historians, this specific is derived from the French word ha-ha meaning "an unexpected obstacle on a path". 

Additionally, the recollect Gabriel Sagard (baptized Théodat) published the Dictionary of the Huron Language (Paris, 1632), listing the noun Háhattey, meaning "road, lane or address".

The toponym "Petit lac Ha! Ha!" was made official on December 5, 1968 by the Commission de toponymie du Québec.

References

See also
 Le Fjord-du-Saguenay Regional County Municipality, a RCM
 Ferland-et-Boilleau, Quebec, a municipality
 Lake Ha! Ha!

Lakes of Saguenay–Lac-Saint-Jean
Tributaries of the Saint Lawrence River